The Gujarat Giants are an Indian women's cricket team that compete in the Women's Premier League (WPL), based in Ahmedabad, Gujarat. The team is owned by Adani Group. The team is coached by Rachael Haynes, and their squad was assembled at the inaugural WPL player auction in February 2023.

History
In October 2022, the BCCI announced its intentions to hold a five-team women's franchise cricket tournament in March 2023. The tournament was named the Women's Premier League in January 2023, with investors buying the rights to franchises through a closed bidding process during the same month. Adani Group, the owners of the Gujarat Giants kabaddi team, bought the rights to one of the franchises.

On 30 January 2023, Mithali Raj joined Gujarat Giants as a mentor. 

In February 2023, Rachael Haynes was announced as head coach of the side. The inaugural player auction for the WPL was held on 13 February 2023, with Gujarat Giants signing 18 players for their squad.

Current squad
As per 2023 season. Players in bold have international caps.  denotes a player who is unavailable for the rest of the season.

Support Staff

Source: Official website

Kit manufacturers and sponsors

Source: Official website

Notes

References

Cricket clubs established in 2023
Women's Premier League (cricket) teams
Adani Group